The Balloon (Swedish: Ballongen) is a 1946 Swedish comedy film directed by Göran Gentele and Nils Poppe and starring Poppe, Marianne Löfgren, Ingrid Borthen and Inga Landgré. The film's sets were designed by the art directors Nils Svenwall and Arne Åkermark.  It was the second in a series of films feature Poppe in the role of Sten Stensson.

Main cast
 Nils Poppe as 	Sten Stensson Stéen / Orvar Knatte / Yusuf / Kungen / Beppo
 Marianne Löfgren as 	Gunlög
 Marianne Gyllenhammar as 	Scheherazade
 Ingrid Borthen as 	Drottningen
 Inga Landgré as 	Rosita
 Marianne Aminoff as 	Vanda Nowak
 Ulla Norgren as 	Majken
 Ellen Halvorsen as 	Dansös
 Oscar Winge as 	Kosmos
 Arne Lindblad as 	Torbjörn Tvärvigg
 Sigge Fürst as 	Jerker Lemmalytt
 Benkt-Åke Benktsson as 	Kalifen
 Hilding Gavle as 	Storvisiren
 Erik Hell as 	Älskaren
 Stig Olin as 	Michael Kollinsky

References

Bibliography 
 Klossner, Michael. The Europe of 1500-1815 on Film and Television: A Worldwide Filmography of Over 2550 Works, 1895 Through 2000. McFarland, 2002.
 Qvist, Per Olov & von Bagh, Peter. Guide to the Cinema of Sweden and Finland. Greenwood Publishing Group, 2000.

External links 
 

1946 films
Swedish comedy films
1946 comedy films
1940s Swedish-language films
Films directed by Göran Gentele
Films directed by Nils Poppe
Swedish sequel films
1940s Swedish films